Syria Phoenicia (also Syro-Phoenicia,  adjectival Syro-Phoenician) may refer to:
Phoenicia under Hellenistic rule
Phoenicia under Roman rule
Phoenice (Roman province) (c.194–630s)
Syro-Phoenicians, the ethnic Canaanite population of southern Roman Syria
The biblical Syrophoenician woman (Mark 7:26)

See also
Phoenicia (disambiguation)
Achaemenid Phoenicia
History of Lebanon
Syro-Hittite